The 2018 AIHL season was the 19th season of the Australian Ice Hockey League (AIHL). It ran from 21 April 2018 until 26 August 2018, with the Goodall Cup finals following on 1 and 2 September 2018. The CBR Brave won both the H Newman Reid Trophy after finishing the regular season with the most points in league history, and the Goodall Cup for the first time by defeating the Sydney Bears in the final.

Teams
In 2018 the AIHL had 8 teams competing in the league.

League business
In December 2017 the Sydney Ice Dogs released their logo for the 2018 season. The design was an adjusted version of the 15th anniversary logo, replacing the "XV" with a shield. A few days later the Sydney Bears unveiled their new logo featuring a re-designed Bear. Following the release of their new logo the Bears released their new jerseys which included a black home, white away and a red alternate version. In February 2018 the Bears signed All About Caring as a major sponsor for the season. The same month the Melbourne Mustangs signed with The Kodiak Group to be their new naming rights sponsor for the next two seasons. The Kodiak Group replace The James Hotel who held the rights in 2017. In March 2018 the Melbourne Ice signed partnerships with the charity 300 Blankets and not-for-profit Kids Under Cover. Both organisations focus on helping the homeless and part of deal with 300 Blankets will see the Ice selling blankets at their home games. In April the Adelaide Adrenaline signed with Complete Podiatry to be a sponsor and the club's official podiatry clinic. Also in April the Mustangs announced that they had signed with restaurant Billy's Discrict to be their post-game venue, replacing The James Hotel which had been their venue since May 2016. On 8 April the Newcastle Northstars that Warners at the Bay had signed with the club as their official post-game venue for 2018. The Melbourne Ice announced on 10 April that they had signed with Tempur Australia to be their naming rights sponsor for the next three years. The deal also included captain Lliam Webster being appointed as a brand ambassador for Tempur. The Brave announced that The Signal Co. Wireless and Maliganis Edwards Johnson had signed on as major sponsors and Ace High Eatery & Bar, Care Traffic, Coffey, Compass Wealth Group and T C Air & Electric had signed on as business sponsors for 2018. The Brave also switched their post game venue to the Hellenic Club of Canberra's Fillos Taverna + Bar, replacing The Woden Tradies & Quality Hotel which had been their venue since June 2017. In April the Sydney Ice Dogs signed with the Holiday Inn Express Sydney Macquarie Park to be a major sponsor for the 2018 season. They also announced that they would partner with Cheapskate Hockey to create an alternative jersey as well as produce a line of merchandise. The alternate jersey will feature a redesigned bulldog logo. On 20 April the Sydney Ice Dogs announced that The Ranch Hotel would be their post game venue for 2018, replacing TGI Fridays Macquarie Centre which was their venue for the previous season.

Exhibition games
In January 2018 the Perth Thunder announced that they would hold a three-game exhibition series against an All-Stars team from the China Ice Hockey League. The games were held on 15, 17 and 17 February at the Perth Ice Arena. The Thunder lost the opening game 1–3 but tied the series with a 4–1 in game two. The All-Stars won the series with a 2–1 win in game three. On 7 April the Melbourne Ice and Melbourne Mustangs held their annual exhibition match at the O'Brien Group Arena. The Ice defeated the Mustangs 3–2. The following week the Melbourne Ice hosted the Hockey Festival at the O'Brien Group Arena. The festival ran over 14 and 15 April and included the Ice, Adelaide Adrenaline, CBR Brave and Melbourne Mustangs. Day one of the festival saw each team compete in a round-robin competition in order to determine the playoff spots on day two. The Mustangs finished the round-robin at the top of the standings, one point ahead of the Ice, the Adrenaline finished in third and the Brave in last place. Day two included two games, a final between first and second and a placement game for third place. The Ice defeated the Mustangs 3–2 in the final to claim the Warrior Cup, while the Adrenaline beat the Brave 4–2 to finish in third place.

Personnel changes
On 15 October the Newcastle Northstars announced that Andrew Petrie had stepped down from the position of head coach following a mutual decision with the club. A month later the Sydney Ice Dogs announced the signing of Petrie as their head coach. Petrie replaced Christopher Blagg who moved into the position of club president. Petrie previously coached the Ice Dogs in 2014. On 14 November the Melbourne Mustangs' announced that head coach Michael Flaherty would not be returning for the 2018 season. Flaherty was replaced two weeks later by Maxime Langelier-Parent, a former import for the club who had served as an assistant coach in 2017. On 10 February the Ice Dogs announced Jason Juba had stepped down from his positions of general manager and vice president in order to focus on family and business. Also in February the CBR Brave announced that they had signed Mike Sargeant and Gordon Cockell as assistant coaches for the 2018 seasons. In April the Adelaide Adrenaline announced that Sami Mantere had stepped down from the position of head coach in order to return full time as a player for the club. Mantere was also signed on as an assistant coach. Mantere was replaced in the position of head coach by Jim Fuyarchuk. On 17 April the Brave announced that they had signed Johan Steenberg as Director of Player Development and Player Personnel. Steenberg was previously at the Melbourne Ice from 2014 to 2017 as their goaltending coach. On 19 April Northstars announced that Joey Theriault, Ray Sheffield and Garry Doré will share the coaching duties for the 2018 season, replacing Andrew Petrie who left in October 2017. Just prior to the start of the season the Melbourne Ice announced the signing of Peter Ekroth to the position of head coach. Ekroth replaced Charles Franzén who has moved into the position of Director of Coaching and Player Development.

Player transfers

Interclub transfers

Retirements

New signings

Players lost

Regular season
The regular season began on 21 April 2018 and will run through to 26 August 2018 before the top four teams advance to compete in the Goodall Cup playoff series.

April

May

June

July

August

Standings

Source

Statistics

Scoring leaders
List shows the ten top skaters sorted by points, then goals. Current as of 23 September 2018

Leading goaltenders
Only the top five goaltenders, based on save percentage with a minimum 40% of the team's ice time. Current as of 23 September 2018

Season awards

Below lists the 2018 AIHL regular season award winners.

Source pt1 Source pt2

Goodall Cup playoffs
The 2018 playoffs was scheduled for 1 September with the Goodall Cup final held on 2 September. Following the end of the regular season the top four teams advanced to the playoff series which was held at O'Brien Group Arena in the Docklands precinct of Melbourne, Victoria. The series was a single game elimination with the two winning semi-finalists advancing to the Goodall Cup final. The Goodall Cup was won by the CBR Brave (first title) who defeated the Sydney Bears 4-3 in overtime after the two sides finished regulation time locked at 3-3. The Brave’s Canadian import forward, Trevor Gerling, was named the finals most valuable player (MVP) after he scored the winning goal in overtime.

All times are UTC+10:00

Semi-finals

Final

All-Star weekend
The 2018 AIHL All-Star Weekend was held at the Adelaide Ice Arena, Adelaide on 2 and 3 June 2018. The format of the weekend was unchanged from 2017 with a skills competition on 2 June and an all-stars game on 3 June. Adelaide Adrenaline's Josef Rezek and David Huxley were initially announced as the captains of the two teams replacing Jamie Bourke and Lliam Webster from 2016. Huxley was later replaced by the Adrenaline's Zachary Boyle due to Huxley's retirement prior to the 2018 season. The Adrenaline's head coach Jim Fuyarchuk and assistant coach Sami Mantere were named as the coaches of Team Boyle and Team Rezek respectively. APA Group re-signed as sponsor of the weekend after sponsoring the previous three events.

The skills competition saw the Adelaide Adrenaline and Sydney Bears take out two of the seven events each, while the Newcastle Northstars, Perth Thunder and Sydney Ice Dogs all picked up one each. On 3 June Team Rezek defeated Team Boyle 13-8 in the All-Star Game to claim the Mick McCormack Cup.

Skills competition
Breakaway Challenge: Josef Rezek (Adelaide Adrenaline)
Elimination Shootout: Sebastian Andersson (Adelaide Adrenaline)
Fastest Skater: Jamie Woodman (Perth Thunder) – 12.53 seconds
Goaltender Race: Anthony Kimlin (Sydney Bears)
Hardest Shot: Nathan Chiarlitti (Sydney Ice Dogs) – 154 km/h
Shooting Accuracy: Nick Rivait (Newcastle Northstars) – 12.65 seconds
Stickhandling: Charlie Adams (Sydney Bears) – 18.15 seconds

All-star game

References

External links
The Australian Ice Hockey League

2018 in ice hockey
2018 in Australian sport
2018